Joseph Stickney (1840–1903) was a wealthy coal broker in Pennsylvania. He was a native of Concord, New Hampshire, and made a fortune before the age of 30 investing in the coal business.

Stickney was born on May 31, 1840 in Concord, New Hampshire to Joseph Pearson Stickney (1796–1877) and  Lucretia Gibson Stickney (1809–1840). In 1881, Stickney and his partner, John N. Conyngham, purchased the large Mount Pleasant Hotel, in the White Mountains region of New Hampshire, from lumberman John T. G. Leavitt. It was later demolished. In 1894, he married Carolyn S. Foster (1869–1936) of Waltham, Massachusetts. There were no children from the union.

Stickney constructed the luxurious Mount Washington Hotel in Bretton Woods, New Hampshire, which opened in 1902, the year before his death. The Mount Washington is one of the few surviving grand hotels of the Gilded Age. 

Stickney died on December 21, 1903, in New York City. In 1913, his widow Carolyn Foster Stickney was remarried to Aymon de Faucigny-Lucinge (1862–1922), a French aristocrat.

Stickney was the subject of a September 2019 episode of the podcast Lore.

References

See also
Find a Grave

People from Waltham, Massachusetts
Businesspeople from Massachusetts
Businesspeople from Pennsylvania
American businesspeople in the coal industry
1840 births
1903 deaths
19th-century American businesspeople
People from Concord, New Hampshire